Jatu may refer to:
 Jatu, Iran, a village in Iran
 Jatu, a dialect of the Haryanvi language of India
 A Rajput clan

See also 
 Jattu, a town in Nigeria